Jefferson Brenes Rojas (born 13 April 1997) is a Costa Rican professional footballer who plays as a midfielder for Liga FPD club Herediano and the Costa Rica national team.

Career
Brenes began his professional career with Limón in the Liga FPD in 2017, before signing with Herediano on 15 July 2019. On 14 December 2019 he was loaned to Municipal Grecia. He returned to Herediano on 23 June 2020.

International career
Brenes debuted with the Costa Rica national team in a 1–0 friendly loss to Panama on 10 October 2020. He was called up to represent Costa Rica at the 2021 CONCACAF Gold Cup.

References

External links
 
 

1997 births
Living people
People from Limón Province
Costa Rican footballers
Costa Rica international footballers
Costa Rica youth international footballers
Association football midfielders
Municipal Grecia players
C.S. Herediano footballers
Liga FPD players
2021 CONCACAF Gold Cup players